Hocine Chebaïki (born November 12, 1976) is a retired Belgian footballer who last played for Olympic Charleroi.

Club career
Of Algerian descent, Chebaïki began his career with La Louvière. He spent half a season with Mons in the Belgian Pro League, making 8 appearances. In the summer of 2005, Chebaïki joined Veikkausliiga side AC Allianssi.

References

External links
 
 

1976 births
AC Allianssi players
Belgian footballers
Belgian expatriate footballers
Belgian people of Algerian descent
Belgian Pro League players
Expatriate footballers in Finland
Footballers from Hainaut (province)
R.A.A. Louviéroise players
Royale Union Saint-Gilloise players
R.A.E.C. Mons players
UR La Louvière Centre players
Challenger Pro League players
Veikkausliiga players
Living people
Association football midfielders
Sportspeople from Mons
Belgian expatriate sportspeople in Finland